Nelson Airport  is located in Nelson, British Columbia, Canada. It is located along the coast of Kootenay Lake, in a narrow, mountainous valley. The airfield is several blocks from downtown Nelson. This airport is distinct from Fort Nelson Airport in Fort Nelson, in the northeast corner of B.C.

The airport was the site of the 2011 Nelson Flightfest on 6 August 2011.

See also
Nelson Water Aerodrome

References

External links
Nelson Pilots' Association
Nelson Airport

Registered aerodromes in British Columbia
Nelson, British Columbia